Thomas Granville Burch (July 3, 1869March 20, 1951) was an American farmer, tobacco manufacturer, and politician from Martinsville, Virginia. He represented Virginia in the U.S. House of Representatives from 1931 until 1946. In 1946 he served as a U.S. Senator after Carter Glass died in office until a successor was elected.

Biography
Burch was born near the community of Dyer's Store in Henry County, Virginia. Early in his life, he worked as a farmer and for a tobacco manufacturing company. After his move to Martinsville, where he was elected mayor, Burch worked in banking, and later in the real estate and insurance businesses, owning a business devoted to both. Burch was elected as a Democrat to the 72nd Congress in 1931, and served until May 1946, when he was appointed to the United States Senate. Thomas 'Tom' Burch was married April 22, 1903 to Mary Ellen Anson, the daughter of Rev. Alfred W. Anson, an Episcopal priest born at Windsor Castle, son of Hon. Rev. Frederick Anson.

On March 20, 1951 Burch died of a heart attack in Martinsville and was buried in the city's Oakwood Cemetery.

Elections

1930; Burch was elected to the U.S. House of Representatives unopposed.
1932; Burch was re-elected with the Democratic slate in Virginia's at-large Congressional district, he won 8.29% in a 24-way race.
1934; Burch was re-elected with 88.18% of the vote, defeating Republican Henry P. Wilder and Socialist Ira C. Wentz.
1936; Burch was re-elected with 64.96% of the vote, defeating Republican Taylor G. Vaughan.
1938; Burch was re-elected unopposed.
1940; Burch was re-elected unopposed.
1942; Burch was re-elected with 93.14% of the vote, defeating Socialist Howard Hearnes Carwile.
1944; Burch was re-elected with 84.61% of the vote, defeating now-Independent Carwile.

References

External links

 

1869 births
1951 deaths
American Episcopalians
People from Martinsville, Virginia
Democratic Party United States senators from Virginia
People from Henry County, Virginia
Mayors of places in Virginia
Democratic Party members of the United States House of Representatives from Virginia